Passers By may refer to:
 Passers By (1920 film), an American silent drama film, based on the play
 Passers By (1916 film), an American silent drama film, based on the play
 Passers By (play), a 1911 play by C. Haddon Chambers